Campbell Live is a half-hour-long New Zealand current affairs programme that aired  at 7pm (following 3 News) on TV3 and was hosted by John Campbell. Campbell Live conducted interviews of various notable personalities, including Al Gore, Robert Fisk, Tony Blair, as well as an array of celebrities, including Adam Lambert and Metallica.

History
TV3 announced plans to start a 7pm current affairs show in November 2004 after Paul Holmes, who presented a current affairs show called Holmes on TV1, left the state broadcaster to host a similar show on Prime.

Campbell Live started production in February 2005, after John Campbell and Carol Hirschfeld left their 3 News presenter positions to host and produce, respectively, the current affairs show. The show launched on 21 March 2005, with the first story being about fake drivers licences being given to people of Asian descent.

Hirschfeld left her position as Executive Producer in September 2009, and was replaced by former Holmes producer Pip Keane.

On 9 April 2015 TV3 owner MediaWorks announced the show is under review due to declining ratings, weeks after the show celebrated 10 years on the air. There was talk of dropping of the show and rumours that the show would be replaced with a show similar to Jono and Ben. The following day the show reported its highest ratings for 2015 after many viewers showed their support for the show by watching the show and posting photos on a Facebook Event page of their TV screening Campbell Live. A petition at website Action Station has over 63,000 signatures as at 12 April 2015 to save the show.

On 21 May 2015 TV3 announced (on Budget day) that the show was to be axed, and replaced by a Monday to Thursday current affairs programme to follow the news. It was also announced that Campbell had decided to leave TV3, despite having been offered a position co-hosting a replacement current affairs programme.

On 29 May 2015, the show's final episode was aired.

Awards
Campbell Live won two awards at the 2006 Qantas Television Awards  including Best Current Affairs Series. The second award was for the Best News or Current Affairs Presenter for John Campbell.

At the 2010 Qantas Television Awards, Campbell Live received three awards, one for Best Current Affairs Editing, one for Best Current Affairs Reporting and John Campbell again won for Best News or Current Affairs Presenter.

At the 2011 Aotearoa Film and Television Awards, Campbell Live received an award for investigation of the year for their work tracking the Samoan tsunami relief funds – presented to host John Campbell, Executive Producer Pip Keane and Producer Claudine MacLean.

Campbell Live has also won The TV Guide Best on the Box People's Choice Award for Best Current Affairs Show from 2011 to 2014 and Best Presenter from 2010 to 2014.

Campbell Live cameraman Grant Findlay won a 2016 Gold Award for Cinematography at the inaugural NZCS (New Zealand Cinematographers Society) Awards for "One night with a St John crew" – story with Ali Ikram, edited by Sarah Rowan; Campbell Live Series 10: Episode 47 – 'News and Current Affairs' category.

Notable staff
 John Campbell – presenter/correspondent reporter
 Carol Hirschfeld – Head of the show
 Pip Keane – Executive Producer (2009 – 29 May 2015)
 Billy Weepu – former camera operator

References

External links
 Home page
 

2000s New Zealand television series
2010s New Zealand television series
2005 New Zealand television series debuts
2015 New Zealand television series endings
New Zealand television news shows
Three (TV channel) original programming
2005 in New Zealand television